Jewels 4th Ring was a mixed martial arts (MMA) event hosted by promotion Jewels.

Background
Hitomi Akano was added to the card later on, along with three other matches and a few days after that, two more matches were added. The show attracted enough attention that tickets were sold out almost a week before the event. The final order of the card was announced three days before the event. The event was kickboxer Rena Kubota's debut with Jewels in a shoot boxing match.

Results

See also
 Jewels (mixed martial arts)
 2009 in Jewels

References

External links
Official results at Jewels 
Event results at Sherdog
Event results at Fightergirls.com
Event results  at Bout Review 
Event results at God Bless the Ring 
Event results at kakutoh.com 
Event results at sportsnavi.com 

Jewels (mixed martial arts) events
2009 in mixed martial arts
Mixed martial arts in Japan
Sports competitions in Tokyo
2009 in Japanese sport